Allan 'Butch' Edwards (born 12 November 1957) is a former Australian rules footballer who played with Richmond, Collingwood and Footscray in the VFL during the late 1970s and early 1980s.

Edwards, a strong marking centre half forward, was a regular fixture in the Richmond side for three years after debuting for Richmond midway into the 1975 season. He finished his first year with 31 goals, including four in their Preliminary Final loss against North Melbourne at Waverly. He contested the finals with Richmond again in 1977.

A knee injury suffered in a 1978 training session kept him out of the team for a long period and after managing just four games in 1979 he was traded to Collingwood. In his first season at Collingwood he made it to his maiden VFL Grand Final but ended up on the losing team. He finished his career at Footscray before being forced to retire following an ankle reconstruction.

Many of Edwards's past and future relations were Australian rules footballers. His grandfather Frank Aked, uncle Frank Aked Jr. and father Arthur Edwards all played for Footscray while his son Jake Edwards played for Carlton and Shane O'Bree, his nephew, played for Brisbane and Collingwood.

References

External links

Holmesby, Russell and Main, Jim (2007). The Encyclopedia of AFL Footballers. 7th ed. Melbourne: Bas Publishing.

1957 births
Living people
Australian rules footballers from Victoria (Australia)
Richmond Football Club players
Collingwood Football Club players
Western Bulldogs players
Melton Football Club players